DGI may refer to:
Danske Gymnastik- & Idrætsforeninger, a Danish association of sports clubs
Digital Genres Initiative
Dirección General de Ingresos or Dirección General Impositiva, Latin American tax authorities
Dirección General de Inteligencia, former name of the Cuban Intelligence Directorate
:fr:Direction générale des Impôts, French tax authority
Disciplined Growth Investors
Disseminated Gonococcal Infection
Distributed Geographic Information
Division of Geographic Information
General Intelligence Directorate, Jordanian intelligence agency